DC4 (abbreviation of Dreamchasers 4) is the eleventh mixtape by American rapper Meek Mill. It was released on October 27, 2016, by Maybach Music Group, Dream Chasers Records and Atlantic Records. The mixtape serves as the fourth installment of his Dreamchasers series, following Dreamchasers 3 (2013). It features guest appearances from Tory Lanez, Lil Uzi Vert, Nicki Minaj, Quavo, Don Q, Young Thug, 21 Savage, YFN Lucci, Maybach Music Group, Guordan Banks, Pusha T, Lil Snupe, and French Montana.

Cover art
Artist R. Craig designed the artwork for DC4, recreating a mugshot of Meek when he was 18 years old. Meek spoke to Billboard about the police brutality he experienced before taking the image, He said, "[I had] a concussion, stitches, braids ripped out," he said. "My blood was on the ceiling, on the floor."

Commercial performance
DC4 debuted at number three on the US Billboard 200, moving 87,000 units in its first week, with 45,000 pure album sales.

Track listing

Track notes
 signifies a co-producer
 signifies an additional producer
 "The Difference" features background vocals from Desiigner
 "Blue Notes" features additional vocals from British guitarist Snowy White
 "You Know" features additional vocals from Nicki Minaj
 "Outro" features additional vocals from Rihmeek "Papi" Williams, who is Meek Mill's son

Sample credits
 "On the Regular" contains samples of "O Fortuna", performed by Carl Orff; and "Hate Me Now", performed by Nas and Puff Daddy.
 "Blessed Up" contains samples of "Think (About It)", performed by Lyn Collins.
 "Blue Notes" contains samples of "Midnight Blues", performed by Snowy White, who is featured in the song.
 "Outro" contains uncredited samples of "Dreams & Nightmares", performed by Meek Mill.

Charts

Weekly charts

Year-end charts

References

2016 mixtape albums
Meek Mill albums
Sequel albums
Maybach Music Group albums
Albums produced by Cubeatz
Albums produced by Honorable C.N.O.T.E.
Albums produced by Jahlil Beats
Albums produced by Murda Beatz
Albums produced by Sonny Digital